The Phillipsburg School District is a comprehensive public school district in Phillipsburg, in Warren County, New Jersey, United States. The district is one of 31 former Abbott districts statewide that were established pursuant to the decision by the New Jersey Supreme Court in Abbott v. Burke which are now referred to as "SDA Districts" based on the requirement for the state to cover all costs for school building and renovation projects in these districts under the supervision of the New Jersey Schools Development Authority.

As of the 2020–21 school year, the district, comprised of five schools, had an enrollment of 3,877 students and 329.0 classroom teachers (on an FTE basis), for a student–teacher ratio of 11.8:1.

The district is classified by the New Jersey Department of Education as being in District Factor Group "B", the second-lowest of eight groupings. District Factor Groups organize districts statewide to allow comparison by common socioeconomic characteristics of the local districts. From lowest socioeconomic status to highest, the categories are A, B, CD, DE, FG, GH, I and J.

The district's high school serves students from the Town of Phillipsburg and from five sending communities at the secondary level: Alpha, Bloomsbury (in Hunterdon County), Greenwich Township, Lopatcong Township and Pohatcong Township, as part of sending/receiving relationships with the respective school districts.

Schools 

Schools in the district (with 2020–21 enrollment data from the National Center for Education Statistics) are:
Early childhood
Early Childhood Learning Center with 354 students in grades PreK-K
Amy Russo-Farina, Principal
Elementary schools
Phillipsburg Primary School with 391 students in grades 1-2
Amy Fontana, Principal
Phillipsburg Elementary School with 609 students in grades 3-5
Darlene Noel, Principal
Middle school
Phillipsburg Middle School with 704 students in grades 6-8
Raffaele LaForgia, Principal
High schools
Phillipsburg High School with 1,730 students in grades 9-12. The Phillipsburg High School Stateliners have an athletic rivalry with neighboring Easton, Pennsylvania's Easton Area High School, which celebrated its 100th anniversary game on Thanksgiving Day 2006. In 2009, the 1993 teams from the Easton P-Burg Game met again for the Gatorade REPLAY Game to resolve the game, which ended in a 7-7 tie, with more than 13,000 fans watching as Phillipsburg won by a score of 27-12.
Matthew Scanlon, Principal

Administration
Core members of the district's administration are:
Gregory Troxell, Superintendent
Staci Horne, Business Administrator / Board Secretary

Board of education
The district's board of education, comprised of nine members, sets policy and oversees the fiscal and educational operation of the district through its administration. As a Type II school district, the board's trustees are elected directly by voters to serve three-year terms of office on a staggered basis, with three seats up for election each year held (since 2012) as part of the November general election. The board appoints a superintendent to oversee the district's day-to-day operations and a business administrator to supervise the business functions of the district. Greenwich, Lopatcong and Pohatcong townships each have an appointed representative serving on the school board.

References

External links
Phillipsburg School District
 
Data for the Phillipsburg School District, National Center for Education Statistics

Education in Hunterdon County, New Jersey
New Jersey Abbott Districts
New Jersey District Factor Group B
Phillipsburg, New Jersey
School districts in Warren County, New Jersey